Damascus is an unincorporated community and census-designated place in southern Mahoning and northern Columbiana counties  in the U.S. state of Ohio. As of the 2020 census, it had a population of 418. The community lies at the intersection of U.S. Route 62 and State Routes 173 and 534.

The community is located in southwestern Goshen Township in Mahoning County and northwestern Butler Township in Columbiana County. Damascus has a post office, with the ZIP code of 44619. It is part of the Youngstown–Warren metropolitan area and the Salem micropolitan area.

Demographics

History
Damascus was platted in 1808. The community derives its name from the ancient city of Damascus, Syria. Damascus was originally built up chiefly by Quakers.

The Damascus post office opened in 1828.

References

Census-designated places in Columbiana County, Ohio
Census-designated places in Mahoning County, Ohio
1808 establishments in Ohio